Homeward Bound Battery and Dam is a heritage-listed stamping mill and reservoir at Croydon, Shire of Croydon, Queensland, Australia. It was built in 1888 by Mr Schumacher. It was added to the Queensland Heritage Register on 21 October 1992.

History 

The Homeward Bound battery commenced crushing on 28 February 1888 with 20 head of stamps. The main mines serving the battery were all situated along the Homeward Bound reef on or near the summit of the ridge above Waterfall Creek. The 20 head of stamps and eight berdan pans were driven by a  portable steam engine.

Water was a problem throughout the Croydon Goldfield and a large dam with a stone pitched wall was constructed in 1888, by a Mr. Shoemaker (or Schumacher). Even so the Homeward Bound battery could not crush that year.

The Mountain Maid United Gold Mining Company (with a nominal capital of 56,000 ten shilling shares) took over the Homeward Bound battery in 1890 but relinquished it to the original company again in 1891. By then the Homeward Bound claim was almost abandoned. Although the major companies had failed, the battery was revitalized in 1893 by co-operative parties who were getting good results. One old miner said in 1896 that the Homeward Bound "has had less public attention paid to it than any other line on this extensive goldfield but left to the stragglers like myself to scratch away". When other Croydon mines were considering closing down, in 1898 the Homeward Bound was producing almost two ozs of gold per ton of stone. Lane and Pate took over the battery in 1901 and cyaniding was commenced in 1902 using some of the equipment from the Pioneer cyanide works at Gorge Creek. However by 1904 the Homeward Bound Company had lost the reef and others were only putting small crushings through and mining gradually petered out.

The average bullion values were amongst the highest on the Croydon Goldfield.

The settlement was never more than a camp with only a store, boarding house and postal receiving office from 1888 to 1893. An open cut mine and carbon-in-pulp treatment plant operated from 1988 to 1990 near the Homeward Bound mining area and surface evidence from earlier workings was lost in the more recent operations.

Description 

The place contains two component groups: the dam and dam wall (or overshot weir) and the battery foundations. The dam wall is expertly constructed of large blocks of rough-shaped stone. The wall contains a lower spillway section. The top of the wall is concrete rendered for the length of its stone construction. A vertical boiler on a base of stamper dyes is located at the northern end of the wall at a former cyanide plant site. The dam is heavily silted and lined with acacia on the upstream edge of the wall.

The battery site, situated on the northern bank of the dam, has been stripped of all buildings and plant. Remaining, are a broken concrete engine mount, concrete and aggregate foundations for twenty head of stamps, a twenty head camshaft with ten cams, and a beam pump arm.

The extent of the settlement was not surveyed.

Heritage listing 
Homeward Bound Battery and Dam was listed on the Queensland Heritage Register on 21 October 1992 having satisfied the following criteria.

The place is important in demonstrating the evolution or pattern of Queensland's history.

The Homeward Bound Battery and Dam is significant in Queensland's history as one of the mining settlements, or suburbs of Croydon, on the former Croydon Goldfield. The place demonstrates a number of stages in the development of Croydon Goldfield - British investment in ore crushing, then cyaniding to fully extract any remaining gold once a permanent water supply had been secured.

The place demonstrates rare, uncommon or endangered aspects of Queensland's cultural heritage.

The dam wall is the most substantial structure surviving at Homeward Bound and is the largest and earliest (1888) associated with mining, recorded in North Queensland. The size and quality of the stonework is noteworthy in a regional context. There were few dams constructed on the Croydon Goldfield even though lack of water was a perennial problem.

References

Attribution

External links 

Queensland Heritage Register
Croydon, Queensland
Dams in Queensland
Articles incorporating text from the Queensland Heritage Register
Gold mines in Queensland
Mining in Queensland